Out & About Newspaper is a free, monthly LGBT newspaper in Nashville, Tennessee.

Overview
Out & About Newspaper was started in 2002. The newspaper has a target audience of more than 250,000 people. Circulation for the newspaper is 30,000 per month. It is the largest LGBT publication in Tennessee.

Out & About Today
The newspaper is produced alongside a broadcast news feature on WTVF-TV called "Out & About Today". "Out & About Today" is hosted by Brent Meredith, Pam Wheeler, and Chuck Long. The news feature focuses on news, entertainment, and business information for the gay and lesbian community of Nashville.

Theft

In August 2012, it was revealed that a thirty-year employee of the Vanderbilt University Medical Center was caught on surveillance cameras stealing copies of the newspaper to throw them away since April of the same year.

References

External links
 

2002 establishments in Tennessee
LGBT in Tennessee
LGBT-related newspapers published in the United States
Mass media in Nashville, Tennessee
Newspapers published in Tennessee
Publications established in 2002